The Sardinian regional election of 1974 took place on 16 June 1974.

One more seat was added.

After the election Giovanni Del Rio, a Christian Democrat, formed a government with the Italian Socialist Party and the Italian Democratic Socialist Party. In 1976 Del Rio was replaced by fellow Christian Democrat Pietro Soddu and the Socialists eventually left the government in 1978.

Results

Sources: Regional Council of Sardinia and Istituto Cattaneo

References

Elections in Sardinia
1974 elections in Italy
June 1974 events in Europe